The men's 4 × 100 metre freestyle relay event at the 2012 Summer Olympics took place on 29 July at the London Aquatics Centre in London, United Kingdom.

Four years after winning the silver medal in this event, the French men's team won gold for  the first time as they edged out the Americans and the Australians with the help of a sterling anchor leg from Yannick Agnel. Trailing behind by 0.55 seconds at the final exchange, Agnel blistered the field with a remarkable split of 46.74 to deliver the foursome of Amaury Leveaux (48.13), Fabien Gilot (47.67), and Clément Lefert (47.39) a gold-medal time in 3:09.93. Meanwhile, the U.S. team of Nathan Adrian (47.89), Michael Phelps (47.15), and Cullen Jones (47.60) handed Ryan Lochte the anchor duties to maintain their lead, but Lochte's split of 47.74 was just a full second behind Agnel's anchor that sealed a stunning triumph for the French, leaving the U.S. with a silver medal in 3:10.38. With the second-place finish, Phelps also earned his first-ever Olympic silver medal to raise his overall tally to seventeen, (including 14 gold and 2 bronze), bringing him a single step closer to the all-time record held by Larisa Latynina.

The Russian quartet of Andrey Grechin (48.57), Nikita Lobintsev (47.39), Vladimir Morozov (47.85), and Danila Izotov (47.60) took home the bronze in 3:11.41 to edge out the more aggressive Aussie foursome of James Magnussen (48.03), Matt Targett (47.83), Eamon Sullivan (47.68), and James Roberts (48.09) by 0.22 seconds, finishing with a fourth-place time in 3:11.63.

South Africa's solid foursome of Gideon Louw (48.48), Darian Townsend (48.36), Graeme Moore (48.36), and Roland Mark Schoeman (48.27) struggled to mount a challenge in a world-record race as they finished fifth in 3:13.45, holding off the hard-charging Germans Benjamin Starke (49.03), Markus Deibler (47.97), Christoph Fildebrandt (48.45), and Marco di Carli (48.07) by seven-hundredths of a second with a sixth-place finish (3:13.52). Italy (3:14.13) and Belgium (3:14.40) also vied for an Olympic medal to round out a historic finish.

In the absence of César Cielo on the morning prelims, Brazil's Nicolas Oliveira (49.31), Bruno Fratus (48.98), Nicholas Santos (49.68), and Marcelo Chierighini (48.17) missed the final roster by almost half a second (0.50) with a ninth-place effort (3:16.14), repeating their performance from the 2011 World Aquatics Championships.

Records
Prior to this competition, the existing world and Olympic records were as follows.

Results

Heats

Final

References

External links
NBC Olympics Coverage

Men's 4 x 100 metre freestyle relay
4 × 100 metre freestyle relay
Men's events at the 2012 Summer Olympics